Gabrielle Therese Blythe (born 9 March 1969) is an Australian racewalker. She competed in the women's 10 kilometres walk at the 1992 Summer Olympics.

References

1969 births
Living people
Athletes (track and field) at the 1992 Summer Olympics
Australian female racewalkers
Olympic athletes of Australia
Place of birth missing (living people)